The Missionary Sisters Servants of the Holy Spirit, also known as Holy Spirit Missionary Sisters, or simply Holy Spirit Sisters (Latin:  Congregatio Missionalis Servarum Spiritus Sancti, SSpS)  is a religious congregation within the Catholic Church. The group has 3,000 members in 46 different countries. The congregation was founded by Arnold Janssen in 1889 in Steyl, the Netherlands. Janssen had previously founded in 1875 a male missionary congregation called Divine Word Missionaries. 
Janssen chose Maria Helena Stollenwerk, called Mother Maria (1852–1900) and Hendrina Stenmanns, called Mother Josepha (1852–1903) as co-foundresses.

This community of religious women is rooted in the Trinitarian spirituality.

Founders

Arnold Janssen (November 5, 1837 – January 15, 1909) was born in Goch, Germany, near the Dutch border and ordained a priest in 1861. In 1875 he founded in Steyl, the Netherlands "St. Michael the Archangel Mission House" to train priests for the missions. From this developed the Society of the Divine Word. 

Helena Stollenwerk was born on 28 November 1852. At a very young age she developed an interest in joining the missions and going to China, but was unable to find a convent that sent missionaries abroad. In 1882 she met Arnold Janssen and worked as a kitchen maid at St. Michael Mission House in Steyl. In 1884, she was joined by Hendrina Stenmanns.

Janssen perceived a need for female missionaries to complement the work of the male missionaries. On 8 December 1889 Stollenwerk became a postulant of a women's congregation established by Janssen, the Missionary Sisters Servants of the Holy Spirit, and on 17 January 1892 assumed the religious name "Maria Virgo". She made her vows on 12 March 1894 and later became abbess on 12 August 1898.

History
The first missionary sisters set out in 1895 for Argentina. Others were sent to Togo in 1897.

Ministry
Ministries include education, health, pastoral care, spiritual guidance, adult education, communication, catechetics, chaplaincy work, social work, administration and interfaith dialogue.

See also
 Holy Spirit Adoration Sisters, the contemplative branch

Further reading
 Hermann Fischer, Life of Arnold Janssen. Founder of the Society of the Divine Word and the Missionary Congregation of the Servants of the Holy Ghost, translated by Frederic M. Lynk, Mission Press S.V.D.: Techny, Ill. 1925, 520 pp.
 Fritz Bornemann, Arnold Janssen: Founder of Three Missionary Congregations, 1837–1909: a Biography. Arnoldus Press: Rome 1975
 E. Kroes, Janssen, Arnold, in: Dizionario degli Istituti di Perfezione, Vol. V (Roma 1978), Ed. Paoline, 297–301.
 E. Kroes, Missionarie Serve dello Spirito Santo, in: Dizionario degli Istituti di Perfezione, Vol . 5 (Roma 1978) 1634–1637.
 Mary E. Best, Seventy Septembers, Holy Spirit Missionary Sisters, Techny, Ill (USA) 1988, 404 pp., 
 Ann Gier, This fire ever burning : A biography of M. Leonarda Lentrup S.Sp.S., Holy  Spirit Missionary Sisters: Techny 1986, 318 pp., 
 Karl Müller, Kontemplation u. Mission. Steyler Anbetungsschwestern 1896–1996, Steyler Verlag, Netttal 1996, XII + 532 pp. + Bilder, 
 Sr. Domenique Coles SSpS – Fr. Frank Mihalic SVD, Sent by the Spirit. 100 years of SSpS mission history in Papua New Guinea 1889–1999, Holy Spirit Sisters, Madang 1999, 61 pp.
 Josef Alt SVD, Journey in Faith. The Missionary Life of Arnold Janssen, Studia Instituti Missiologici SVD 78, Steyler Verlag: Nettetal / Germany 2002, XVIII + 1078 S.,

References

External links
 Josepha Hendrina Stenmanns (1859–1903) Co-Foundress of the Mission Congregation Servants of the Holy Spirit
 Maria Helena Stollenwerk (1852–1900) Co-Foundress of the Mission Congregation Servants of the Holy Spirit

Catholic female orders and societies
Religious organizations established in 1889
Catholic religious institutes established in the 19th century